Sir William Castle Cleary KBE CB (14 March 1886 – 19 January 1971) was a senior British civil servant.

Biography

Born on 14 March 1886, Sir William Cleary was educated at Bedford School and at Trinity College, Cambridge.  He was  Principal Private Secretary to Hastings Lees-Smith, Sir Donald Maclean and Lord Halifax, as Presidents of the Board of Education, between 1931 and 1935.  He was Principal Assistant Secretary for Elementary Education between 1940 and 1945, and Deputy Secretary at the Ministry of Education between 1945 and 1950.

Sir William Cleary died on 19 January 1971.

References

1886 births
1971 deaths
People educated at Bedford School
Alumni of Trinity College, Cambridge
Companions of the Order of the Bath